Salmtal is an Ortsgemeinde – a municipality belonging to a Verbandsgemeinde, a kind of collective municipality – in the Bernkastel-Wittlich district in Rhineland-Palatinate, Germany. It became well known countrywide for the football club FSV Salmrohr, who played in the Second Football Bundesliga in the 1986/1987 season.

Geography

Location 
The municipality lies in the Wittlich Depression in the valley of the river Salm (Salmtal in German – the municipality's namesake) on the Autobahnen A 1 and A 60, and on the Koblenz–Trier line. Salmtal belongs to the Verbandsgemeinde of Wittlich-Land, whose seat is in Wittlich, although that town is itself not in the Verbandsgemeinde.

Constituent communities 
Salmtal's Ortsteile are Dörbach and Salmrohr.

History 
In 1007, Salmrohr had its first documentary mention as Rore bei Seleheim (compare Sehlem), and in 1250, Dörbach had its first documentary mention as Derinbach. Beginning in 1794, both Dörbach and Salmrohr lay under French rule. In 1814 they were assigned to the Kingdom of Prussia at the Congress of Vienna. From 1947, they were part of the then newly founded state of Rhineland-Palatinate. On 7 June 1969, the new municipality of Salmtal was formed out of the two former municipalities.

Politics

Municipal council 
The council is made up of 16 council members, who were elected by proportional representation at the municipal election held on 7 June 2009, and the honorary mayor as chairman.

The municipal election held on 7 June 2009 yielded the following results:

Mayors 
The Mayor of Salmtal is Markus Peter Meyer.

Coat of arms 
The German blazon reads: Unter goldenem Schildhaupt, darin ein wachsender roter, silberbewehrter Löwe, gespaltener Schild, vorne in Silber ein blauer Anker, hinten Eisenhutfeh in Silber.

The municipality's arms might in English heraldic language be described thus: Per pale argent an anchor palewise azure and vair proper, in a chief Or a demilion gules armed of the first.

The charges are all drawn from Dörbach's and Salmrohr's history. Salmrohr and part of Dörbach were once under the lordship of the Knights of Esch, which accounts for the arms’ similarity to those borne by that municipality. However, in Salmtal's arms, the “vair” pattern (called Eisenhutfeh in German, or “iron hat fur”, a reference to the helmetlike shapes) appears only on the sinister (armsbearer's left, viewer's right) side, with an anchor charge on the dexter (armsbearer's right, viewer's left) side. This is drawn from the arms borne by Abbot Jacobus Otto of Trier, which can be seen on the gable at the Dörbacher Mühle (mill), formerly known as the estate mill of the former Klausen Augustinian Canonical Monastery.

The arms have been borne since 3 January 1980, when they were approved by the Regierungsbezirk administration.

Culture and sightseeing 
Salmtal has the following points of interest:
 Acidic spring in the Hexengraben (“Witch Ditch”)
 Saint Martin's Parish Church (Pfarrkirche St. Martin)
 Dörbacher Mühle (mill)
 Salmrohrer Mühle (mill)
 Saint Wendelin's Chapel (Wendelinuskapelle)

References

External links 
Municipality’s official webpage 

Bernkastel-Wittlich